Dick Clark's World of Talent is a talent/variety television show produced by Irving Mansfield and broadcast weekly in the United States on the ABC television network from 10:30-11 p.m. (ET) on Sundays during the 1959-60 season.

History
The first show was broadcast September 27, 1959. Dick Clark hosted throughout the run of 
the series.  Permanent judge Jack E. Leonard, and two celebrity "guest" judges watched the performances of amateur, semi-professional (and, on occasion, professional) singers, musicians, dancers, and comedians, and offered advice.  Some of the guest judges were Johnny Carson, Betty Hutton, Zsa Zsa Gabor, Tab Hunter, Edie Adams, Eva Gabor, and Sam Levenson.

Performers
Guests on the show included:
 R&B singer Tommy Edwards (broadcast October 18, 1959)
 Classical pianist Lorin Hollander (broadcast October 4 or 11 or 18, 1959)
 Folk music duo Bud and Travis
 Big–band singer Don Cornell
 Cocktail singer Alan Dale
 Vocal quartet the Four Aces
 Singer/actress Della Reese (broadcast November 15, 1959)

Last show
The last show was broadcast December 20, 1959.

References

1959 American television series debuts
1959 American television series endings
1950s American variety television series
American Broadcasting Company original programming
Black-and-white American television shows
Talent shows
Dick Clark